The Springfield Baptist Church  in Springfield, Kentucky, is a historic Baptist church on Lincoln Park Road.  It was built in 1910 and added to the National Register of Historic Places in 1989.

It is a brick building with Tudor arch windows, buttresses, and brick laid in common bond.

References

Baptist churches in Kentucky
Churches on the National Register of Historic Places in Kentucky
Gothic Revival church buildings in Kentucky
Churches completed in 1910
National Register of Historic Places in Washington County, Kentucky
Churches in Springfield, Kentucky
1910 establishments in Kentucky